Brummett is a surname. Notable people with the surname include:

 Austin Brummett (born 2004), American soccer player 
 Greg Brummett (born 1967), American baseball pitcher
 Lyle Brummett (born 1956), American serial killer
 Palmira Brummett (born 1950), American historian
 Tim Brummett (born 1952), American singer-songwriter 
 Tyson Brummett (1984–2020), American baseball pitcher

See also
 Brummet